Gangineni Venkateswara Rao was elected as the Member of the Legislative Assembly for Vinukonda constituency in Andhra Pradesh, India, in 1983 and 1985. He represented the Telugu Desam Party on the first occasion and the Communist Party of India on the second.

References

Telugu Desam Party politicians
Communist Party of India politicians from Andhra Pradesh
Telugu politicians
Year of birth missing
Possibly living people
Andhra Pradesh MLAs 1983–1985
Andhra Pradesh MLAs 1985–1989